El Alba Airport,  is an airport  northwest of Melipilla, a city in the Santiago Metropolitan Region of Chile.

There are hills southeast of the runway.

See also

Transport in Chile
List of airports in Chile

References

External links
OpenStreetMap - El Alba
OurAirports - El Alba
FallingRain - El Alba Airport

Airports in Santiago Metropolitan Region